Helena Ryšánková (born 19 November 1992) is a Czech handballer for CS Minaur Baia Mare.

She participated at the 2018 European Women's Handball Championship.

Achievements
Czech First Division:
Winner: 2013, 2014, 2015
EHF Challenge Cup:
Winner: 2013

References

 

1992 births
Living people
Sportspeople from Prague
Czech female handball players
Expatriate handball players
Czech expatriate sportspeople in France
Czech expatriate sportspeople in Romania
21st-century Czech women